Julio Fernando Santos Masías (born November 21, 1976) is a retired male freestyle swimmer from Ecuador. He competed in three consecutive Summer Olympics for his native South American country, starting in 1996. He was born in Portoviejo, Manabí.

References

1976 births
Living people
Ecuadorian male freestyle swimmers
Olympic swimmers of Ecuador
Swimmers at the 1996 Summer Olympics
Swimmers at the 2000 Summer Olympics
Swimmers at the 2004 Summer Olympics
Swimmers at the 2003 Pan American Games
Florida State University alumni
People from Portoviejo
Pan American Games competitors for Ecuador